Sorkočević may refer to:
 House of Sorkočević, a noble family originating from the city of Dubrovnik
 Franatica Sorkočević (1706–1771), a Croatian writer from Ragusa
 Luka Sorkočević (1734–1789), a Croatian composer from the Republic of Ragusa (Dubrovnik)
 Antun Sorkočević (1775–1841), a diplomat, writer, composer
 Elena Pucić-Sorkočević (1786–1865), the first female composer in the Republic of Ragusa

Croatian surnames